The Music Victoria Awards of 2016 are the 11th Annual Music Victoria Awards and consist of a series of awards, presented on 16 November 2016, during Melbourne Music Week. For the first time this year, the Best Venue award was separated into of over and under 500 capacity.

Hall of Fame inductees
 Triple R 

Chair of Board of Directors, former long-term broadcaster, and Triple R first music coordinator Geoff King said, "I'm really proud of the contribution Triple R has made to our musical and intellectual life so it's great to have such a public celebration in its 40th year. The Music Victoria Hall of Fame induction is a powerful way of recognising Triple R's achievements when placed alongside earlier inductees, particularly the likes of Stan Rofe and Bill Armstrong, without whom Melbourne would not have developed such a strong music scene."

Award nominees and winners

All genre Awards
Winners indicated in boldface, with other nominees in plain.

Genre Specific Awards

References

External links
 

2016 in Australian music
2016 music awards
Music Victoria Awards